Rik de Voest and Lu Yen-hsun were the defending champions, but they did not compete in 2010 (Lu chose to play only in singles tennis).Rameez Junaid and Frank Moser won the final against Vasek Pospisil and Adil Shamasdin 6–3, 6–4.

Seeds

Draw

Draw

External links
 Main Draw

Samsung Securities Cup - Doubles
2010 Doubles